Drei Unteroffiziere (Three Sergeants) is a 1939 German film.

Made soon before the outbreak of the Second World War, the film - as its name suggests - depicts the lives of three German army sergeants. While the plot concentrates on the soldier characters' complicated love affairs rather than their battlefield exploits, it does extol camaraderie among soldiers - a staple theme of Nazi propaganda. The film concludes with the protagonists overcoming amorous jealousies which threatened to divide them, and eagerly embarking on a dangerous military task. This theme is well reflected in the film's poster, in whose foreground the three in uniform face their commanding officer while on the background appears the actress Gerda for whose love they had competed with each other.

After the defeat of Nazi Germany, Drei Unteroffiziere was included in the list of forbidden films, and nowadays its screening is only allowed for "special educational purposes".

Cast
Albert Hehn as Unteroffizier Erich Rauscher
Fritz Genschow as Unteroffizier Fritz Kohlhammer
Wilhelm König as Unteroffizier Struwe
Wilhelm Althaus as Hauptmann Gruber
Heinz Engelmann as Leutnant Strehl
Wolfgang Staudte as Hauptfeldwebel Kern
Ruth Hellberg as Gerda Cyrus
Peter Anders as Operasinger
Günther Ballier as Soldat der 3. Kompanie
Josef Gindorf as Schütze der 3. Kompanie
Malte Jäger as Schütze Hermannsfeld
Christian Kayßler as Dr. Lauterbach, Kapellmeister
Otto Klopsch as Ehemaliger Soldat, Gast in der "Grünen Erbse"
Erwin Laurenz as Soldat der 3. Kompanie
Guenther Markert as Ein Gast im Café
Hermann Meyer-Falkow as Ein Kollege Gerdas
Luise Morland as Frau Werner, Gerdas Hauswirtin
Hermann Pfeiffer as Lohmann, Hilfsregisseur
Waldemar Potier as unknown		
Ferry Reich as Schütze Hofacker
Herbert Scholz as unknown		
Elisabeth Schwarzkopf as Carmen in den Theaterszenen
Günther Treptow as Don José in den Theaterszenen
Ingeborg von Kusserow as Lisbeth, Telefonistin
Eduard Wandrey as Preysing in den Theaterszenen
Claire Winter as Lotte, Verkäuferin

See also 
List of films made in the Third Reich
Nazism and cinema

External links

Allmovie review
Contemporary New York Times review 

1930s German-language films
1939 films
Films of Nazi Germany
German black-and-white films
German drama films
1939 drama films
1930s German films